Mohamed Sanu Sr. (born August 22, 1989) is an American football wide receiver who is a free agent. He played college football at Rutgers and was drafted by the Cincinnati Bengals in the third round of the 2012 NFL Draft. Sanu has also been a member of the Atlanta Falcons, New England Patriots, Detroit Lions, San Francisco 49ers, and the Miami Dolphins.

Early life
Originally from Sayreville, New Jersey, Sanu was born to a Muslim family and also lived in his parents' native Sierra Leone as a child. Sanu returned to the United States and lived in Dayton, New Jersey, where he eventually starred at South Brunswick High School as a triple option quarterback before enrolling at Rutgers University in 2009. In his final season at South Brunswick High School, Sanu led the Vikings to their first playoff berth in nearly 40 years, including three rushing touchdowns of at least 80 yards against Edison High School.

He was ruled ineligible to play during his senior year, due to exceeding NJSIAA's age restriction; he graduated from high school six months early and enrolled at Rutgers University in January 2009.
In track & field, Sanu was one of the state's top performers in the jumping events. At the 2008 NJSIAA Sectional Championships, he placed 2nd in the triple jump (14.08 m) and 3rd in the long jump (6.43 meters). He also competed as a sprinter, recording personal-best times of 6.94 seconds in the 55 metres and 24.28 seconds in the 200 meters at the 2008 Merli Invitational. He is a fan of soccer, and supports West Ham United.

College career
As a true freshman wide receiver Sanu had 51 receptions for 639 yards and three touchdowns; he also ran 62 times for 346 yards and five touchdowns out of the Wildcat formation. Sanu was the first-ever true freshman to start at wide receiver for Rutgers under coach Greg Schiano, and won Most Valuable Player honors at the 2009 St. Petersburg Bowl. In 2010, Sanu was a consensus preseason All-Big East wide receiver. In 2011 he tied a Big East record with 13 receptions against North Carolina. The next week, he broke his own record by catching 16 passes. In 2011, Sanu broke the Big East single-season reception record with 115 receptions for 1,206 yards, a record previously held by Pitt's Larry Fitzgerald.

In his three seasons at Rutgers, Sanu caught 210 passes for 2,263 yards and 19 touchdowns, and gained 3,019 all-purpose yards. He also completed eight of 18 passes for 207 yards and four touchdowns, recorded an interception and punted twice for 67 yards.

Statistics

Professional career

Cincinnati Bengals
The Cincinnati Bengals selected Sanu in the third round (83rd overall) of the 2012 NFL Draft, the 12th wide receiver taken that year. He signed a four-year, $2.71 million contract with them that included a signing bonus of $563,252.

2012 season

On September 23, 2012, against the Washington Redskins, Sanu came in as the wildcat quarterback out of a shotgun formation for the Bengals on the first play from scrimmage of the game and threw a 73-yard touchdown pass to A. J. Green. This not only made him the first Bengals wide receiver ever to throw a touchdown pass, but it also gave him a touchdown pass before his first NFL reception.

Sanu had his first touchdown catch during Week 10 against the New York Giants. He finished the game with four receptions for 47 yards. During Week 12 against the Oakland Raiders, Sanu had five receptions for 29 yards and two touchdowns in the 34–10 victory for his first NFL game with multiple touchdowns. On November 30, 2012, it was announced that Sanu had season-ending surgery to repair a stress fracture.

2013 season
Sanu played in all 16 games of the 2013 NFL season, finishing with 47 receptions for 455 yards and two touchdowns.

The Bengals finished atop the AFC North with an 11–5 record. In the Wild Card Round against the San Diego Chargers, his playoff debut, Sanu had a 13-yard reception in a 27–10 loss.

2014 season
In the 2014 season, Sanu played a much bigger role in the Bengals offense due to injuries to receivers A. J. Green and Marvin Jones. Sanu recorded two 100-yard games in 2014. During Week 2, he recorded a career-long 76-yard touchdown reception from quarterback Andy Dalton in the 24–10 victory over the Atlanta Falcons. In the next game against the Tennessee Titans, Sanu threw an 18-yard touchdown pass to Dalton in the 33–7 victory.

It was Sanu's fourth completion of his career on four passing attempts and the second touchdown pass of his career. In Week 6 he had a career-high 10 receptions against the Carolina Panthers, for 120 yards and a touchdown in a 37–37 tie. During Week 8 against the Baltimore Ravens, he had five receptions for a career-high 125 yards in the 27–24 victory.

The Bengals returned to the playoffs with a 10–5–1 record. In the Wild Card Round against the Indianapolis Colts, he had three receptions for 31 receiving yards on seven targets in the 26–10 loss.

2015 season
In the 2015 season, Sanu had 33 receptions for 394 yards. In Week 9 he scored his first NFL rushing touchdown on a 25-yard reverse against the Cleveland Browns. The Bengals finished with a 12–4 record and finished atop the AFC North. In the Wild Card Round against the Pittsburgh Steelers, he had three receptions for 17 receiving yards in the 18–16 loss.

Atlanta Falcons
On March 10, 2016, Sanu signed a five-year, $32.5 million contract with the Atlanta Falcons.

2016 season
In his Falcons debut against the Tampa Bay Buccaneers, Sanu had five receptions for 80 yards, a touchdown, and a two-point conversion in the 31–24 loss. He finished the regular season with 59 receptions for 653 yards and four touchdowns.

The Falcons finished atop the NFC South and reached the playoffs with an 11–5 record. In the Divisional Round against the Seattle Seahawks he had four receptions for 44 yards and a touchdown in the 36–20 victory. In the NFC Championship against the Green Bay Packers he finished with five receptions for 52 yards and a touchdown in the final NFL Game in the Georgia Dome. The Falcons reached Super Bowl LI, playing against the New England Patriots. Sanu had two receptions for 25 yards in the 34–28 overtime defeat.

2017 season
During Week 2, Sanu had a season-high 85 receiving yards in a 34–23 victory over the Green Bay Packers. During Week 12, Sanu threw a 51-yard touchdown pass to wide receiver Julio Jones in a 34–20 win over the Tampa Bay Buccaneers. Sanu finished the 2017 season with 67 receptions for 703 yards and five touchdowns. The Falcons posted a 10–6 record and qualified for the playoffs. In the Wild Card Round against the Los Angeles Rams he had four receptions for 75 yards in a 26–13 victory. In the Divisional Round, he had three receptions for 50 yards in a 15–10 loss to the eventual Super Bowl LII champion Philadelphia Eagles.

2018 season

After a relatively slow start to the 2018 season, Sanu had six receptions for 111 yards in a narrow Week 4 37–36 loss to the Cincinnati Bengals. During the regular-season finale, Sanu threw a five-yard touchdown pass to quarterback Matt Ryan in a 34-32 road victory over the Tampa Bay Buccaneers, the fourth of Sanu's career.

Sanu finished the 2018 season with a 66 receptions for a career-high 838 yards and four touchdowns.

2019 season 
During a Week 4 24-10 loss to the Tennessee Titans, Sanu had nine receptions for a season-high 91 yards. In the next game against the Houston Texans, Sanu had five receptions for 42 yards and a touchdown in the 53-32 road loss.

Sanu had 33 receptions, 313 receiving yards, and a touchdown with the Falcons before being traded to the New England Patriots.

New England Patriots
On October 22, 2019, Sanu was traded to the New England Patriots in exchange for a second-round pick in the 2020 NFL Draft.

In his Patriots debut, against the Cleveland Browns, Sanu had two receptions on two targets for 23 yards. In Week 9 against the Baltimore Ravens, Sanu had a season-high 10 receptions for 81 yards and a touchdown in the 37–20 loss. In the Wild Card Round against the Titans, he had an 11-yard reception in the 20–13 loss. Sanu had 26 receptions, 207 receiving yards, and a touchdown in his first season with the Patriots.

Sanu was placed on the active/physically unable to perform list at the start of training camp on August 2, 2020, and was activated from the list two days later. On September 3, Sanu was released by the Patriots.

San Francisco 49ers
On September 18, 2020, Sanu signed with the San Francisco 49ers. He was released on October 6, 2020.

Detroit Lions
On November 6, 2020, Sanu was signed to the Detroit Lions practice squad. He was elevated to the active roster on November 21 for the team's Week 11 game against the Carolina Panthers, and reverted to the practice squad after the game. Sanu was promoted to the active roster on November 25, 2020. He finished the 2020 season with 17 receptions for 187 yards and one touchdown, which came in Week 12 against the Houston Texans.

San Francisco 49ers (second stint)
On March 30, 2021, Sanu re-signed with the 49ers. He played in eight games before being placed on injured reserve on November 15. He was activated on January 26, 2022. He finished the 2021 season with 15 receptions for 177 yards in eight games.

Miami Dolphins
On July 26, 2022, Sanu signed with the Miami Dolphins. He was released on August 29, 2022.

NFL career statistics

Personal life
In 2014, Sanu partnered a venture with Fantex, Inc., in which Fantex offered an IPO of tracking stock based upon Sanu's future earnings in return for giving Fantex a 10% share of future earnings from his brand. The offering was completed in November 2014, in which 164,300 shares were sold at $10 per share.

Sanu is a practicing Muslim.

References

External links
 

1989 births
Living people
African-American Muslims
American football wide receivers
American people of Sierra Leonean descent
Sportspeople of Sierra Leonean descent
Atlanta Falcons players
Cincinnati Bengals players
Detroit Lions players
New England Patriots players
People from Sayreville, New Jersey
People from South Brunswick, New Jersey
Players of American football from New Jersey
Rutgers Scarlet Knights football players
San Francisco 49ers players
Sierra Leonean Muslims
South Brunswick High School (New Jersey) alumni
Sportspeople from Middlesex County, New Jersey
Miami Dolphins players